Sovremenost is the oldest Macedonian magazine for literature, culture and art. It was created in 1951 as a direct successor of the first Macedonian magazine for art, science and social issues "Nov Den".
The first issue of the first magazine for art, science and social issues, the monthly magazine "Nov Den" was published in October 1945. The editors of "Nov Den" were: Dimitar Mitrev, Vlado Maleski, Blaže Koneski, Slavko Janevski and Kole Čašule.
The magazine for literature, culture and art "Sovremenost" was created by the editors of "Nov den" and is the direct successor of this magazine.
"Sovremenost" exerted a great influence in the promotion and affirmation of Macedonian literature both in the country and abroad. A large number of Macedonian authors debuted on the pages of the magazine, who later became bearers of Macedonian prose, poetry and drama (e.g. Stale Popov with the short stories "Mice Kasapče" and "Petre Andov"), but also authors by whom the magazine was recognized (for example, Aco Šopov, Dimitar Mitrev, Blaže Koneski, and others).

Editors and editorial policy

The chief editors of "Sovremenost" were the writers and publicists:

 1951 - Kiro Hadji Vasilev
 1951-1952 - Vlado Maleski
 1952-53 - Slavko Janevski, Dimitar Mitrev and Aco Šopov
 1954-1957 - Dimitar Mitrev
 1958 - Alexandar Ezhov
 1958-1968 - Dimitar Mitrev
 1969-1982 - Georgi Stalev Popovski
 1983-2002 - Aleksandar Alexiev
 2003-2012 - Vasil Tocinovski
 2013-2017 - Slavčo Koviloski
 2018 - Stefan Markovski

Macedonian writers and actors were part of the editorial teams of "Sovremenost": Kole Čašule, Vasil Iljoski, Gogo Ivanovski, Gane Todorovski, Cvetko Martinovski, Taško Georgievski, Meto Jovanovski, Jovan Boškovski, Miodrag Drugovac, Tome Momirovski, Risto Avramovski, Duško Nanevski, Georgi Stardelov, Simon Drakul, Petar Širilov, Blagoja Anastasovski, Tome Sazdov, Metodi Manev, and others.

References 

1951 establishments